Cinelou Films is an American film production and distribution company founded by Courtney Solomon in 2014. The company's first release was Cake (2014), starring Jennifer Aniston.

Background
In 2014, Courtney Solomon launched a production company titled Cinelou Films. In October 2014, it was announced that the company would be launching a distribution division titled Cinelou Releasing, and its first film would be the drama film Cake, directed by Daniel Barnz and starring Jennifer Aniston. Cinelou's sophomore film was the Eddie Murphy-starring drama film Mr. Church, directed by Bruce Beresford. In 2016, the company produced the adventure comedy-drama film Burn Your Maps (2016), directed by Jordan Roberts and starring Vera Farmiga.  and The Comedian, in development for a number of years, directed by Taylor Hackford and starring Robert De Niro.

Cinelou signed a deal with Warner Bros. to distribute their next six films internationally.

Cinelou also produced the film adaptation of the war drama novel The Yellow Birds, directed by Alexandre Moors and starring Alden Ehrenreich, Tye Sheridan, Jack Huston and Jennifer Aniston. The film premiered at Sundance in January 2017.

Filmography

References

External links
 

Film production companies of the United States
Film distributors of the United States
Companies based in Los Angeles